A535 may refer to:
 HNoMS Valkyrien (A535), a Norwegian naval vessel
 RUB A535, a topical analgesic manufactured by Church & Dwight
 A535 road in Cheshire in England